XHLU-FM is a radio station on 93.5 FM in Ciudad Serdán, Puebla, Mexico. It carries La Ke Buena grupera format from Radiópolis.

History

XELU-AM 1340 received its concession on October 29, 1959. The 250-watt station was owned by Antonio Bautista García. The AM station would end its life transmitting with 10,000 watts day and 5,000 at night.

XELU was cleared to move to FM in 2011. In 2014, ownership passed from Victoria Hernández Cruz, who had bought it in 1989, to Bautista Paulino.

References

Radio stations in Puebla